Aaj Ke Shahenshah is a 1990 Hindi-language action film, produced by I.A. Desai and Saleem Khan under the D.S. Films banner and directed by Shibu Mitra. It stars Jeetendra, Chunky Pandey, Raj Babbar, Kimi Katkar, Sonam  and music composed by Bappi Lahiri.

Plot
The film begins with love birds Saawan & Barkha. Apart from that, Pinky is an adamant and techy, daughter of a hoodlum Kanchan Seth infatuated with Saawan. Now, Saawan & Barkha fraternize with their respective brothers Barsati & Vikram / Vicky. Vicky is justice-seeking whereas Barsati is a ruffian. Here, the situation turns, as the two men are rivals and declare abstention of the lovers. Bewildered, Saawan & Barkha seek reality. Prior, Vicky & Barsati are good friends until the arrival of Nisha, a girl loved by both. However, Nisha tunes Vicky when outraged Barsati molests her, so, she is detached from Vicky and the warfare aroused. Nevertheless, Saawan & Barkha stick strongly. Parallelly, Kanchan Seth settles Pinky's alliance with Saawan which he denies, and elopes with Barkha, and destiny lands them at Nisha. Ascertaining the situation, Nisha determines to unite them by resolving the rift. Besides, Kanchan Seth words his daughter to retrieve Saawan but he falsifies by means to harm. Being cognizant of it, Vicky and Barsati bind and safeguard the lovers. The movie ends with Barsati sacrificing his life as contrition for his sin by knitting Vicky and Nisha.

Cast

Jeetendra as Vikram / Vicky 
Chunky Pandey as Saawan  
Raj Babbar as Barsaati 
Kimi Katkar as Nisha  
Sonam as Barkha
Raza Murad as Kanchan Seth
Ranjeet as Mangal
Iqbal Khan 
Om Shivpuri as Lawyer
Chandrashekhar Vaidya as Barsaati Father
Ashalata Wabgaonkar as Barsaati Mother
Amritpal as Madhav
Tej Sapru
Yunus Parvez
Sonika Gill as Pinky

Soundtrack

References

External links
 

1990s Hindi-language films
Films scored by Bappi Lahiri
Films directed by Shibu Mitra
Hindi-language action films
Indian action films